Big Fight may refer to:

The Big Fight (1930 film), a 1930 film
The Big Fight (1972 film), a 1972 Hong Kong film
Asterix and the Big Fight, the seventh volume in the French comic book series, Asterix
Asterix and the Big Fight (film), a 1989 animated movie based on the seventh volume in the Asterix comic book series
Big Fight Special, an episode from the first series of the BBC Comedy KYTV, originally shown in 1990
The Big Fight Live, a British boxing television programme
Kiseki no Big Fight, the closing theme song of the Dragon Ball Z film Kiken na Futari! Super Senshi wa Nemurenai
Big Fight: Big Trouble in the Atlantic Ocean, a 1992 arcade game developed and published by Tatsumi
"Is Usagi Going it Alone? The Sailor Warriors Get Into a Big Fight", a Sailor Moon episode
The Tascosa Gunfight, an Old West gunfight that took place in Tascosa, Texas